Abushev is a surname. Notable people with the surname include:

Magomedgasan Abushev (born 1959), Soviet Russian sport wrestler
Rangel Abushev (born 1989), Bulgarian footballer
Rasim Abushev (born 1963), Azerbaijani footballer

See also
Abashev